Chris Moreno is an American comic book illustrator.

Comic books

Marvel Comics
 | World War Hulk: Front Line Issue #2
 World War Hulk: Front Line Issue #4
 World War Hulk: Front Line Issue #5
 World War Hulk: Front Line

Image Comics
 Popgun Vol. 1, 2007  (illustrator)
 Paul Jenkins Sidekick, (illustrator)
 The Wicked West Abomination & Other Tales:"The Horri-Belle Truth" , 2004

BOOM! Studios
 Toy Story: The Mysterious Stranger, 2009
 Zombie Tales #1: A Game Called Zombie, 2007
 Fear the Dead: A Zombie Survivors Journal #1, written by Michael Alan Nelson 2006

Zenescope Entertainment
 Grimm Fairy Tales April Fools' Edition, 2009
 Grimm Fairy Tales Volume 2, 2007,

Silent Devil Comics
 Dracula vs. King Arthur #1-#4 2005
 Dracula vs. Capone, 2006
 The Minions of Ka, Book One 2008, 
 Monkey in a Wagon Vs. Lemur on a Big Wheel, (Co-creator)
 The Last Sin of Mark Grimm, written by M. Sean McManus 2007

Other comic art
 Knights of the Dinner Table, Kenzer and Company
 Superfrat, (web comic)
 Unusual Suspects, published by Top Cow 2007
 Teddy Scares Vol. 2, published by Ape Entertainment 2007

Creator-owned projects
 The Rot Pack (illustrator)
 Tyrannosaurus West (illustrator)
 Goth Ninja (illustrator)

Other work
Gymkommentary with Matt Singer.

References

External links

 Comic Book Database
 Origins of Super Frat
 Comic Vine
 The Grand Comics Database Project

Interviews 
 From the beginning
 Comic Geek Speak
 Phoenix Cactus Comicon 2008
 San Diego Comicon 2007
 Fearnet.com "Zombie Dickheads" 2011

Websites 
 Official Website
 Myspace Page
 Facebook Page
 Facebook Fan Site
 Superfrat Website
 Silent Devil Bio
 Gymkommentary with Matt Singer & Chris Moreno
 Zombie Dickheads

Living people
American comics artists
American comics writers
Artists from New Jersey
Year of birth missing (living people)